Terahertz tomography is a class of tomography where sectional imaging is done by terahertz radiation. Terahertz radiation is electromagnetic radiation with a frequency between 0.1 and 10 THz; it falls between radio waves and light waves on the spectrum; it encompasses portions of the millimeter waves and infrared wavelengths. Because of its high frequency and short wavelength, terahertz wave has a high signal-to-noise ratio in the time domain spectrum. Tomography using terahertz radiation can image samples that are opaque in the visible and near-infrared regions of the spectrum. Terahertz wave three-dimensional (3D) imaging technology has developed rapidly since its first successful application in 1997, and a series of new 3D imaging technologies have been proposed successively.

Terahertz imaging
Terahertz imaging has advantages over the more expensive and shorter range X-ray scanners. A variety of materials are transparent to terahertz radiation, which allows it to measure the thickness, density, and structural properties of materials that are difficult to detect. Since terahertz is not ionizing radiation, the use of terahertz does not cause damage to living tissue, making terahertz a safe, non-invasive biomedical imaging technique. Moreover, because many materials have a unique spectral signature in the terahertz range, terahertz radiation can be used to identify materials. Terahertz imaging is widely used in the study of semiconductor material properties, biomedical cell imaging, and chemical and biological examination. Terahertz time domain systems (THz-tds) have made significant advances in 2D imaging. THz-tds is able to determine the sample complex dielectric constant, usually 0.1–4 THz, and provides information about the static characteristics of the sample over dozens of frequencies. However, this technology has some limitations. For example, due to the lower power of the beam, the sensor must be more sensitive. Low image acquisition speeds may force a tradeoff between time and resolution.

Applications
Terahertz imaging can be useful for luggage and postal mail screening because it can identify substances on the basis of their characteristic spectra in this frequency band, such as explosives and illicit drugs; for example, several liquid explosives can be distinguished by the change in dielectric response in the terahertz range as a function of alcohol percentage. Although dangerous metal objects, such as knives, can be recognized by their shapes through certain pattern recognition algorithms, it is impossible to see through metallic packages with terahertz waves. Thus, terahertz spectrometers cannot replace X-ray scanners, even though they provide more information than X-ray scanners for low-density materials and chemical separation.

Terahertz systems are used for production control in the paper and polymer industries. They can detect thickness and moisture content in paper and conductive properties, moisture level, fiber orientation and glass-transition temperature in polymers.

Terahertz systems facilitate the detection of metallic and nonmetallic contamination in food. For example, terahertz waves made it possible to detect metallic and nonmetallic foreign matter in chocolate bars, since food with low water contents, such as chocolates, are almost transparent in the terahertz band. Terahertz tomography is also useful in the wine and spirits industries for quantifying moisture and analysing cork non-destructively.

Terahertz imaging can detect different isomers have different spectral fingerprints in the terahertz range, which enables terahertz spectroscopy to distinguish between stereoisomers—a crucial distinction in pharmacy, where one isomer may be the active compound and its enantiomer may be inactive or even dangerous. Terahertz systems are also used for gauging tablet coating quality.

Terahertz imaging enables non-destructive analysis of valuable artworks and can be conducted onsite. It can reveal hidden layers and via the transmittance of various pigments. It is also being investigated as a tool for 3D visualization.

Terahertz tomography methods
Terahertz tomography can be divided into transmission and reflection mode. It acts as an extension of X-ray computed tomography (CT) to a different waveband. It mainly studies the establishment of process models such as refraction, reflection and diffraction when terahertz waves transmit samples, which has certain requirements for reconstruction algorithms. According to the different transmission delay of Terahertz wave reflected signal at different depths inside the sample, the depth information can be obtained by processing the reflected signal inside the sample to realize the tomography. Terahertz time-of-flight tomography (THz-TOF) and THz optical coherence tomography (Thz-OCT) are mainly used in implementation.

THz diffraction tomography
In diffraction tomography, the detection beam interacts with the target and uses the resulting scattered waves to build a 3D image of the sample. The diffraction effect and the diffraction slice theorem shine light on the surface of the scattered object and record the reflected signal to obtain the diffraction field distribution after the sample in order to explore the surface shape of the target object. For fine samples with more complex surface structure, diffraction tomography is effective because it can provide a sample refractive index distribution. However, there are also drawbacks: although the imaging speed of terahertz diffraction tomography is faster, its imaging quality is poor due to the lack of an effective reconstruction algorithm. In 2004, S. Waang et al. first used diffraction chromatography based on the THz-tds system to image polyethylene samples.

THz tomosynthesis
Tomosynthesis is a technique used to create high-image tomography. The reconstruction can be done by several projection angles, which creates the image faster. This technique has low resolution but faster imaging speed. This technique also has an advantage over terahertz CT. Terahertz CT is significantly affected by reflection and refraction, especially for wide and flat plate samples, which has a large incidence angle at the edge and severe signal attenuation. Therefore, it is difficult to obtain both complete projection data and substantial noise information simultaneously. However, terahertz fault synthetic tomography is not affected by refraction and reflection because of the small incidence angle during projection. It is an effective method for local imaging, rapid imaging, or incomplete sample rotation. In 2009, N. Unaguchi et al. in Japan used continuous terahertz solid-state frequency multiplier with frequency of 540 GHz to conduct TS imaging on three letters "T", "H" and "Z" at different depths of post-it notes. The back projection method and wiener filter were used to reconstruct the spatial distribution of three letters.

THz time of flight tomography
Terahertz fault chromatography can reconstruct the 3D distribution of the refractive index by reflecting the terahertz pulse at different depths in the sample. The depth distribution information of the refractive index can be obtained by analyzing the time delay of the peak value of the reflected pulse. The longitudinal resolution of time-of-flight tomography depends on the pulse width of terahertz waves (usually in the tens of microns); therefore, the vertical resolution of flight time chromatography is very high. In 2009, J.Takayanagi et al. designed an experimental system that successfully used tomography on a semiconductor sample consisting of three sheets of superimposed paper and a thin two-micron thick layer of GaAs.

3D holography
The THz beam can be incorporated into 3D holography if the differentiation of each multiple scattered terahertz waves of different scattering orders is enabled. With both intensity and phase distribution recorded, the interference pattern generated by object light and reference light encodes more information than a focused image. The holograms can provide a 3D visualization of the object of interest when reconstructed via Fourier optics. However, it remains a challenge to obtain high quality images with this technique due to scattering and diffraction effects required for measurement. The high order scattering measurement usually results in poor signal to noise ratio (SNR).

Fresnel lenses 
Fresnel lenses serve as a replacement for traditional refractive lenses with the advantages of being small and lightweight. As their focal lengths depend on frequencies, samples can be imaged at various locations along the propagation path to the imaging plane, which can be applied to tomographic imaging.

Synthetic aperture processing (SA) 
Synthetic aperture processing (SA) differs from traditional imaging systems when collecting data. In contrast to the point-to-point measurement scheme, SA uses a diverging or unfocused beam. The phase information collected by SA can be adopted for 3D reconstruction.

Terahertz computed tomography (CT)
Terahertz computed tomography records both amplitude and spectral phase information when compared to X-ray imaging. Terahertz CT can identify and compare different substances while non-destructively locating them.

See also
Terahertz time-domain spectroscopy                                          
Terahertz radiation
Terahertz nondestructive evaluation                                         
Terahertz metamaterial
Tomography

References

Tomography